Jan Bednář (born 26 August 2002) is a Czech ice hockey goaltender currently playing for Acadie–Bathurst Titan of the Quebec Major Junior Hockey League (QMJHL). Bednář was drafted 107th overall by the Detroit Red Wings in the 2020 NHL Entry Draft.

Playing career
During the 2018–19 Czech Extraliga season, Bednář made his professional debut for HC Karlovy Vary at the age of 16, becoming the youngest goaltender to play for Karlovy Vary. He recorded a 2.73 goals-against average (GAA) and .917 save percentage in 10 games. During the 2019–20 Czech Extraliga season, he recorded a 4.39 GAA and .884 save percentage in 13 games for Karlovy Vary. He also spent time with HC Banik Sokolov of Czech 2.liga, where he posted a 3.26 GAA and a .873 save percentage in 24 games.

Bednář was drafted second overall by the Acadie–Bathurst Titan in the CHL Import Draft. He was signed by the Titans on August 25, 2020.

International play
Bednář represented the Czech Republic at the 2019 IIHF World U18 Championships, where he recorded a 3.21 GAA and a .892 save percentage. He represented the Czech Republic at the 2022 World Junior Ice Hockey Championships.

Career statistics

References

External links
 

2002 births
Living people
Acadie–Bathurst Titan players
HC Baník Sokolov players
Czech ice hockey goaltenders
HC Karlovy Vary players
Detroit Red Wings draft picks
Sportspeople from Karlovy Vary
Czech expatriate ice hockey players in Canada